In Greek mythology, Alegenor (Ancient Greek: Ἀλεγήνωρ) was the son of Itonus, son of Boeotus. He was the brother to Hippalcimus, Electryon and Archilycus. Alegenor had two sons, Clonius and Promachus.

Family

Diodorus' account 

 "And Itonus, the son of Boeotus, begat four sons, Hippalcimus, Electryon, Archilycus, and Alegenor. Of these sons Hippalcimus begat Peneleos, Electryon begat Leïtus, Alegenor begat Clonius, and Archilycus begat Prothoënor and Arcesilaüs, who were the leaders of all the Boeotians in the expedition against Troy."

Homer's account 

 ".... for the wife also of Promakhos son of Alegenor will never be gladdened by the coming of her dear husband..."

Notes

References 

 Diodorus Siculus, The Library of History translated by Charles Henry Oldfather. Twelve volumes. Loeb Classical Library. Cambridge, Massachusetts: Harvard University Press; London: William Heinemann, Ltd. 1989. Vol. 3. Books 4.59–8. Online version at Bill Thayer's Web Site
 Diodorus Siculus, Bibliotheca Historica. Vol 1-2. Immanel Bekker. Ludwig Dindorf. Friedrich Vogel. in aedibus B. G. Teubneri. Leipzig. 1888–1890. Greek text available at the Perseus Digital Library.
 Homer, The Iliad with an English Translation by A.T. Murray, Ph.D. in two volumes. Cambridge, MA., Harvard University Press; London, William Heinemann, Ltd. 1924. Online version at the Perseus Digital Library.
 Homer, Homeri Opera in five volumes. Oxford, Oxford University Press. 1920. Greek text available at the Perseus Digital Library.

Boeotian characters in Greek mythology